Kase Station is the name of two train stations in Japan:

 Kase Station (Kumamoto) (加勢駅)
 Kase Station (Aomori) (嘉瀬駅)